Gustav Overbeck (from 1867 von Overbeck, in 1873 Baron von Overbeck, in 1877  Maharaja of Sabah and Rajah of Gaya and Sandakan; born 4 March 1830 in Lemgo; died 8 April 1894 in London) was a German businessman, adventurer and diplomat.

Biography 
Overbeck was the son of pharmacist and medical councillor Georg Heinrich Overbeck from Lemgo. He came to Bremen for a commercial apprenticeship with his uncle in the family business there, but did not stay long, and emigrated to the United States in the spring of 1850 with his cousin August Meier. He went to San Francisco and opened a business, while undertaking adventurous trade journeys to Hawaii, the South Seas, Alaska, and the Bering Strait.

He came into contact with the English trading house Dent & Co., which in 1854 gave him a job in British Hong Kong. There, he had four children with a Chinese woman named Lam Tsat-Tai. They were Lily Overbeck, Oi Moon Overbeck, Annie Overbeck and Victoria Overbeck. In 1856, he was appointed Prussia's Vice Consul before becoming a consul for the Austrian Empire in 1864. Following the Austro-Prussian War, Overbeck resigned from his Prussian post in 1866. In 1867, towards the end of the war, he was elevated to the aristocracy. 

In January 1876, he purchased from Joseph William Torrey for $15,000 the concessionary rights of American Trading Company of Borneo to territories in northern Borneo, conditional on the successful renewal of the concessions from local authorities. Overbeck was appointed Maharaja of Sabah and Rajah of Gaya and Sandakan in a 29 December 1877 treaty with Brunei Sultan Abdul Momin, who still claimed ownership of northern Borneo. That same year, Overbeck founded a joint venture (known as Dent & Overbeck Company/Overbeck & Co.) with the British brothers Alfred and Edward Dent, who acted as financiers.

From November 1877, he undertook an expedition to Borneo with an American steamer for the acquisition of territorial rights and the exploitation of mineral resources in the territory. Following his expedition, he met with the Sultan of Sulu and forged a second treaty with Sultan Jamalulazam of Sulu, who titled him Dato Bendahara and Raja Sandakan on 22 January 1878. The far-reaching concession attracted great attention in Europe and the United States; The Washington Post described it as the most important transfer obtained by a commercial company since the days of the British East India Company.

However, on 22 July 1878, Spanish forces operating from the Philippines forced the Sultan of Sulu to surrender, causing Overbeck to lose his title and territory in the north-eastern areas just gained from the Sultan. Overbeck then returned to Europe from 1879–80 to seek support for an enforcement of the concession agreement and to promote the territory to the German Empire, Austria-Hungary and the Kingdom of Italy. As the United Kingdom had a strong interest in Borneo, Overbeck managed to gain support from that country; meanwhile, in his home country, only Alexander Georg Mosle supported his bid to acquire the territory as part of the German Empire.

At the beginning of 1881, the British North Borneo Provisional Association Limited was established after Overbeck transferred its rights to the Dent brothers. Within a year, the company succeeded in pushing back the Spanish claim, establishing the territory as a British protectorate known as North Borneo. To this day, the interpretation of the Jawi concession documents of 1877–78 plays a role in the international dispute between Malaysia and the Philippines regarding territorial claims in northern Borneo (presently known as Sabah).

On 16 March 1870, Overbeck married Romaine Madeleine Goddard (1848–1926). Her father, already deceased, was Daniel Convers Goddard (1822–1852), the first Assistant Secretary in the United States Department of the Interior; her mother Madeleine Vinton Dahlgren (1825–1898), daughter of the Congressman Samuel F. Vinton, was a well known author who married Admiral John A. Dahlgren in 1865 (her second marriage). The wedding of Overbeck and Romaine Goddard on 16 March 1870 was a social event in Washington, D.C., attended by President Ulysses S. Grant, his wife Julia Grant, Chief Justice Salmon P. Chase, and numerous ambassadors.

The couple had three sons: Baron Gustav Convers von Overbeck, Baron Oscar Karl Maria von Overbeck and Baron Alfred von Overbeck (1877–1945). Romaine was an excellent pianist and often stayed with her family in Washington during her husband's journeys; In December 1875, she was presented by Kurd von Schlözer at the German Embassy in Washington, and began a brief, tempestuous affair with Hans von Bülow. Relying financially on the income from a family trust invested in coal mines, she later lived apart from her husband in Baden-Baden and Berlin. Little is known about Overbeck's life in the years following the estrangement. Overbeck died at the age of 64 in London.

Honours 
 1862: Prussian Order of the Crown, 4th Class
 1864: Order of the Iron Crown 3rd Class
 1867: Commander's Cross of the Order of Franz Joseph

Literature 
 Florian Lueke: Konsul, Kaufmann, Maharadscha. Zur Erinnerung an Gustav Freiherr von Overbeck (1830-1894). In: Lippische Mitteilungen aus Geschichte und Landeskunde in German 90 (2021) 233-255.
 Rainer Pape: Gustav Freiherr von Overbeck (1830–1894). Eine biographische Skizze, in: Lippische Mitteilungen aus Geschichte und Landeskultur (in German) 28 (1959) 163–217

References 

1830 births
1894 deaths
People from Lemgo
People from the Principality of Lippe
Commanders of the Order of Franz Joseph
Officiers of the Légion d'honneur